Beytollah Abdollahi is an Iranian reformist politician who is currently representative of Ahar and Heris in the Parliament of Iran. He started his career at the Literacy Movement Organization, and was governor of East Azerbaijan Province territories including Heris County, Sarab County, Shabestar County and Marand County.

2016 election
In 2016 Iranian legislative election, Abdollahi defeated rivals in Ahar and Heris district in a two-rounds race. On 19 May 2016, the Guardian Council declared that the second round elections is voided due to "unlawful interventions" and the representative would be elected in a by-election.

See also
Minoo Khaleghi
Khaled Zamzamnejad

References

Living people
1959 births
University of Tabriz alumni
People from East Azerbaijan Province
Iranian reformists
Iranian elected officials who did not take office